Keep Britain Tidy is a UK-based independent environmental charity. The organisation campaigns to reduce litter, improve local places and prevent waste. It has offices in Wigan and London.

History
Keep Britain Tidy was originally set up by a conference of 26 organisations in 1955. The conference was initiated by the British Women's Institute after a resolution was passed at its 1954 AGM to start a national anti-litter campaign.

In 1987, Keep Britain Tidy changed its name to Tidy Britain Group.

In 2002, following a merger with environmental awareness charity, Going for Green, the charity changed its name to ENCAMS — short for Environmental Campaigns.

In June 2009, the charity changed its name back to Keep Britain Tidy, introducing a new logo highlighting the IT within BRITAIN, reading "Keep It Tidy" as well as "Keep Britain Tidy". The "tidyman" logo is still used in public campaigns, alongside campaign straplines such as "Let's keep it tidy!" and "Help keep it tidy!"

Following a year-long strategic alliance, in 2011 Keep Britain Tidy merged with the environmental charity Waste Watch. Keep Britain Tidy became the trading name.

Programmes
Keep Britain Tidy runs a number of programmes in England, including Eco-Schools, Seaside Awards, BeachCare, RiverCare, WatersideCare, LOVEmyBEACH, Keep Britain Tidy Network, Love Parks, Big Tidy Up, Green Flag Award for parks and green spaces and the Blue Flag Award for beaches. The organisation managed Keep Scotland Beautiful, Keep Wales Tidy and Tidy Northern Ireland until 2004, at which point they became independent devolved organisations. The Eco-Schools and Blue Flag programmes in Wales, Northern Ireland, and Scotland are now run independently by these devolved organisations.

See also
Clean Up Australia
Keep America Beautiful
National Cleanup Day
National Tidy Town Awards (disambiguation)
Thames21

References

External links

Litter
Environment of the United Kingdom
Charities based in Greater Manchester
1955 establishments in the United Kingdom
Organizations established in 1955
Organisations based in Wigan